The Charlatan is a 1929 part-talkie film directed by George Melford for Universal Pictures. It starred Holmes E. Herbert, Margaret Livingston and Rockliffe Fellowes. The film is based on the 1923 play The Charlatan by Leonard Praskins and Ernest Pascal.

Plot
A wealthy socialite invites a carnival sideshow performer named Count Merlin to entertain her guests at a party. As the night goes on, a murder occurs and a dark secret from Merlin's past is revealed.

Cast
 Holmes Herbert - as Count Merlin (aka Peter Dwight)
 Margaret Livingston - as Florence
 Rockliffe Fellowes - as Richard Talbot
 Philo McCullough - as Dr. Paynter
 Anita Garvin - as Mrs. Paynter
 Crauford Kent - as Frank Deering
 Frank Mackaye - as Jerry Starke
 Dorothy Gould - as Ann Talbot
 Rose Tapley - as Mrs. Deering

Production
The film was based on the play The Charlatan by Ernest Pascal and Leonard Praskins. The play was adapted by Robert N. Lee with dialogue by Jack Rollens and Tom Reed and intertitled by Reed. Universal designed the film as one of their Jewel Productions for 1929.

Release
The Charlatan was first released on April 7, 1929, as a silent feature and then re-released on April 14, 1929, as a part talkie and part silent film.  The silent version ran 64 minutes. The April 14 partial sound release had a 60-minute running time with a review in Variety stating that about 15 minutes of the film contained dialogue.

References

External links

1929 films
Films directed by George Melford
American black-and-white films